Luss General Store is a building in Luss, Argyll and Bute, Scotland. It is a Category C listed structure dating to the mid-19th century. It was formerly the village post office.

The building, a single-storey structure located on Pier Road, is a rectangular plan with apsidal ends. It is made of stugged pink sandstone ashlar with painted ashlar margins. It has projecting bracketed eaves and a broad corniced chimney stack with a single circular can.

The building is shown on the first-edition Ordnance Survey map, surveyed in 1864.

See also
List of listed buildings in Luss, Argyll and Bute

References

External links
View of the building – Google Street View, October 2016

19th-century establishments in Scotland
Listed buildings in Luss, Argyll and Bute
Category C listed buildings in Argyll and Bute